Microcheilia is a congenital disorder where one's lips are unusually small.

References

External links 

Lip disorders
Congenital disorders of eye, ear, face and neck